is a Japanese tarento, gravure idol and sportscaster, affiliated with Horipro.

Biography
In 2009, Kojima won the Grand Prize from among the 33,910 people in the 34th Horipro Tarento Scout Caravan. The same year on October 25, she appeared in television for the first time in TBS Akkoniomakase! with Akiko Wada.

In June 2010, Kojima is the manager of Horipro Entertainers Women's Futsal team Xanadu loves NHC. Her uniform number is over the number of times of Horipro talent scout caravan which was awarded the Grand Prix "34". The same year on July 6, Kojima had a singing debut with "Min'na no yume" in the anime Stitch!.

On March 31, 2012, she appeared in the TBS sports program, S☆1, where she is in charge of the studio progress and interviews. Taking the opportunity, the agency came to serve also facilitator of professional boxing relay with a terrestrial television broadcasting rights in Japan.

On January 12, 2013, at the 21st All-Japan High School Women's Football Championship digest program and the relay program of the TBS production, Kojima was responsible for the main caster together with Masashi Nakayama (former Japan national football team player). In the following year at the 22 Annual Meeting, she served as the main caster alone.

In 2013, Kojima appeared as a panelist in Patena no kamisama!, she  appeared from time to time even in standing Osaka stations produced programs broadcast is mainly in the Kansai. From December 27 to January 5, 2014, in the 93rd National High School Rugby Tournament highlights program by the production of the agency, she was the caster with Daisuke Ohata (Kobelco Steelers Ambassador, former rugby Japan national team). During her appearance, Kojima was also involved in the coverage of the high school and the players that participated in the tournament. She also appeared on the 94th tournament of the following year with Ohata. In the digest program, Kojima was responsible for the studio progress over the entire time.

In 2014, she was appointed to the Parco Swim Dress campaign. The same year on March 2, Kojima appeared Manzai Lovers supesharu 〜 Ytv manzai shinjin-shō kettei-sen 〜 with Koji Higashino. The same year on September 23, she was in the world Valley girls Italy tournament relay program of TBS production, with Motoko Obayashi, and was responsible for the studio MC along with the players.

In April 2015, Kojima appeared in information program to be broadcast on TBS series nationwide network in the morning every Saturday at MBS production Saturday Plus in (the successor program of Shittoko!), with Kazuki Kosakai and  Ryuhei Maruyama (Kanjani Eight).

Filmography

TV series

Current Appearances

Former Appearances

Commercials

Stage

References

External links
 
 Official agency profile 

1993 births
Living people
People from Ichihara, Chiba
Japanese gravure models
Japanese television personalities
Horipro artists